A detailee is an employee of a United States executive branch government agency temporarily assigned to another position, generally in another U.S. government agency or an international organization.  The employee's original agency will usually continue to pay the person's salary.

References

See also 
 Definition of detailee at Wiktionary

Federal government of the United States